Miss Hong Kong Pageant 2017 was held in TVB City on 3 September 2017. 12 delegates competed for this title.

Results

Placements

Special Awards
Miss Photogenic: Juliette Louie
big big channel The Most Popular Contestant: Boanne Cheung

The following awards were given during sponsor or promotion event.
Best Accessory Award: Boanne Cheung
Sasa Beauty Award: Regina Ho
Sasa The Most Popular Contestant: Kelly Ng
Sasa Best KOL Award: Kelly Ng

The following big big channel special awards were given after the pageant in the programme "The 1st Failed Miss Hong Kong Pageant".
big big channel The Most Tempting TVBody Award: Kelly Ng
big big channel Miss Un-photogenic: Katarina Li
big big channel Best Hair Award: Sandy Leung
big big channel Failed Miss Hong Kong winner: Mandy Yau
big big channel Best Foot Award: Suki Wong
big big channel Miss Super Friendship: Nicole Kam

Delegates
The Miss Hong Kong 2017 delegates were:

Top 10

Top 12

Elimination chart

Judges
Main Judging Panel:
Carol Cheng Yu Ling (鄭裕玲)
Natalis Chan Pak Cheung (陳百祥)
Michael Miu Kiu Wai (苗僑偉)
Jessica Hester Hsuan (宣　萱)
Calvin Choy Yat-Chi @ Grasshopper (蔡一智 @草蜢)
Remus Choy Yat-Kit @ Grasshopper (蔡一傑 @草蜢)
Edmond So Chi-Wai @ Grasshopper  (蘇志威 @草蜢)
Vincent Wong Ho Shun (王浩信)
Jacqueline Wong Sum-wing (黃心穎)
Grace Chan (陳凱琳)

Post-Pageant Notes
 Juliette Louie placed 2nd runner-up in Miss Chinese International Pageant 2018 in Hong Kong.
 Juliette Louie placed 3rd runner-up in Miss Face Of Humanity 2022 in  Toronto, Canada.
 Emily Wong unplaced in Miss World 2017 in Sanya, China.
"The 1st Failed Miss Hong Kong Pageant" was held for the 6 delegates who failed to get any awards.
big big channel The Most Tempting TVBody Award: Kelly Ng
big big channel Miss Un-photogenic: Katarina Li
big big channel Best Hair Award: Sandy Leung
big big channel Failed Miss Hong Kong winner: Mandy Yau
big big channel Best Foot Award: Suki Wong
big big channel Miss Super Friendship: Nicole Kam

References

TVB - Miss Hong Kong Pageant 2017
www.juliettelouie.com

Miss Hong Kong Pageants
2017 in Hong Kong
Hong Kong